Newbold Astbury (often just Astbury) is a village and civil parish in the unitary authority of Cheshire East and the ceremonial county of Cheshire, in the north-west of England.

The civil parish holds a combined parish council meeting with the adjacent civil parish of Moreton-cum-Alcumlow, which is consequently called Newbold Astbury-cum-Moreton Parish Council.

History 
Newbold Astbury is mentioned in the Domesday book as belonging to Gilbert de Venables in 1086 having previously belonged to Wulfgeat of Madeley in 1066. In 1066 the annual value was 1 pound income for its lord but in 1086 it was just 8 shillings possibly due to the Harrying of the North. For its households In 1086 the manor had 3 villagers, 2 smallholders, 1 priest (meaning it also had a church), and one rider. For its ploughlands in 1086 it had 4 ploughlands, 1 lords ploughland, and one men's ploughland. For its other resources it had 1 acre of Meadow, 1 league of woodland, and 1 of Church lands.

Astbury is an older settlement than Congleton, the latter originally in the parish. At the time, Astbury was surrounded by swampland. The inhabitants moved uphill to where Congleton is today and Astbury became isolated. According to the National Heritage List for England, there are 25 buildings recognized as designated listed buildings, and one is St. Mary's church. The church of St Mary's remained the parish church for Congleton for many years; it sits at the apex of the village green and is in the Early English and Perpendicular styles, built between the 13th and 15th centuries. The church was built of millstone grit and the detached spire of the mid-14th century looks to be earlier. Inside the proportions and the furniture are both distinguished. The fine woodwork includes 15th-century stalls, screen, and magnificent roofs. Sir Gilbert Scott was responsible for a modest restoration in 1862. Close to it is Astbury St Mary's Church of England Primary School. The Cheshire section of the village of Mow Cop is part of Newbold Astbury and Scholar Green.

See also

 Listed buildings in Newbold Astbury

References

External links
 Photographs of Astbury and St. Mary's Church

Villages in Cheshire
Civil parishes in Cheshire